is a Japanese actress.  She gained international recognition by winning Silver Bear (Best Actress Award)
at Berlin International Film Festival in 2014, for her performance in Yoji Yamada's film The Little House.

Filmography

Film

Television

Awards and nominations

References

External links

 

1990 births
Living people
Actresses from Osaka Prefecture
People from Takatsuki, Osaka
Silver Bear for Best Actress winners